Mill Woods stop is a tram stop under construction in the Edmonton Light Rail Transit network in Edmonton, Alberta, Canada. It will serve as the south terminus of the Valley Line. It is located on the south side of 28 Avenue NW, west of Hewes Way, between Tawa and Mill Woods Town Centre. The stop was scheduled to open in 2020, with the Mill Woods Transit Centre relocated to allow easy connections between bus and train; however, as of December 2022 the  Valley Line had not opened and no definite opening date had been announced.

Around the station
Mill Woods Town Centre
J. Percy Page High School
Holy Trinity Catholic High School
Mill Woods Park

Mill Woods Transit Centre

The Mill Woods Transit Centre is located on Hewes Way and 25 Avenue.

Instead of a concrete island, typical of transit centres in Edmonton, the transit centre was planned to include a promenade with shops next to the bus stops. Construction of the new transit centre began in fall 2019, and it opened April 15, 2021.

The following bus routes serve the transit centre:

References

External links

TransEd Valley Line LRT

Edmonton Light Rail Transit stations
Railway stations under construction in Canada
Edmonton Transit Service transit centres
Valley Line (Edmonton)